"High and Low" is a song by Swedish singer Tove Styrke from her debut studio album, Tove Styrke (2010). It was released as the album's third single on 25 February 2011 through Sony Music. Styrke wrote the song with Fredrik Berger and Patrik Berger. The song did not enter the Sverigetopplistan singles chart, but peaked at number 31 on the DigiListan download chart.

Background
"High and Low" was written by Tove Styrke, Fredrik Berger, and Patrik Berger for Styrke's debut studio album, Tove Styrke (2010). The song was released as the album's third single on 25 February 2011 through Sony Music. A digital extended play (EP) with a 2011 remake of the song and five remixes were included on the release. Swedish duo Boeoes Kaelstigen contributed a minimal techno remix to the EP.

Reception
Kajsa Lindström of Sydsvenskan named "High and Low" the best track on Tove Styrke. Anders Sandlund from Piteå-Tidningen regarded it one of the album's highlights.

"High and Low" did not enter the Sverigetopplistan singles chart. The song peaked at number 31 on the DigiListan chart.

Music video
The accompanying black-and-white music video for the 2011 remake of "High and Low" premiered on 25 March 2011. The video was directed by Christian Coinbergh.

Track listing
Digital EP
 "High and Low" (2011 remake) − 3:31
 "High and Low" (Boeoes Kaelstigen remix) − 5:00
 "High and Low" (Boeoes Kaelstigen remix radio edit) − 3:14
 "High and Low" (Juuso Pikanen remix) − 3:51
 "High and Low" (Tomi Kiiosk Remikksi) − 4:57
 "High and Low" (Umeå remake) − 5:22

Credits and personnel
Credits are adapted from the Tove Styrke liner notes. 

Tove Styrke – songwriting
Patrik Berger – songwriting, production
Fredrik Berger – songwriting

Charts

Release history

References

External links

2010 songs
2011 singles
Tove Styrke songs
Songs written by Tove Styrke
Songs written by Patrik Berger (record producer)
Sony Music singles